There have been two baronetcies created for people with the surname Barrington. As of 2014 one creation is extant.

The Barrington Baronetcy, of Barrington Hall in the County of Essex was created in the Baronetage of England on 29 June 1611, for Francis Barrington, Member of Parliament for Essex. His son, the second Baronet, sat in the House of Commons for Newtown, Essex and Colchester. The third Baronet was also member of parliament for Newtown. He died in 1683, and was succeeded by his grandson, who died in turn unmarried in 1691. The latter's younger brother, the fifth Baronet, was a member of parliament for Essex. He died childless in 1715 and the baronetcy went to a son of the younger son of the third Baronet. The seventh Baronet sat for Newtown for 48 years. Since his marriage was without children, he was succeeded by his younger brother. The latter's son, the ninth Baronet, was also a member of parliament for Newtown. He died childless in 1818, and his younger brother became the next baronet. After the death of the tenth Baronet in 1832, the baronetcy became extinct.

The Barrington Baronetcy, of the City of Limerick, was created in the Baronetage of the United Kingdom on 20 September 1831, for Joseph Barrington. His grandson, the third Baronet died childless in 1872, and was succeeded by his younger brother. Since the latter's grandson, the sixth Baronet had only two daughters, the next baronet became his younger brother. The seventh Baronet died unmarried. As of 2014, the title is held by his kinsman, the eighth Baronet, who succeeded in 2003.

The family seat was Glenstal Abbey, near Murroe, County Limerick. They sold Glenstal and left Ireland in the 1920s, a move largely prompted by the killing of Winifred Barrington, the fifth Baronet's daughter, in an ambush during the Irish War of Independence.

Barrington baronets, of Barrington Hall (1611)

Sir Francis Barrington, 1st Baronet (c. 1570–1628)
Sir Thomas Barrington, 2nd Baronet	(d. 1644)
Sir John Barrington, 3rd Baronet (1605–1683)
Sir John Barrington, 4th Baronet (1670–1691)
Sir Charles Barrington, 5th Baronet (c. 1671–1715)
Sir John Barrington, 6th Baronet (c. 1673–1717)
Sir John Barrington, 7th Baronet (died 1776)
Sir Fitzwilliam Barrington, 8th Baronet (1708–1792)
Sir John Barrington, 9th Baronet (1752–1818)
Sir Fitzwilliam Barrington, 10th Baronet (1755–1832)

Barrington baronets, of Limerick (1831)

Sir Joseph Barrington, 1st Baronet (1764–1846)
Sir Matthew Barrington, 2nd Baronet (1788–1861)
Sir William Hartigan Barrington, 3rd Baronet (1815–1872)
Sir Croker Barrington, 4th Baronet (1817–1890)
Sir Charles Burton Barrington, 5th Baronet (1848–1943)
Sir Charles Bacon Barrington, 6th Baronet (1902–1980)
Sir Alexander Fitzwilliam Croker Barrington, 7th Baronet (1909–2003)
Sir Benjamin Barrington, 8th Baronet (b. 1950)

The heir apparent is the present holder's son Patrick Benjamin Barrington (b.1988).

References

External links 

 

Barrington
Extinct baronetcies in the Baronetage of England